The 2016 All-Ireland Senior Ladies' Football Championship Final featured  and . Cork emerged as winners after a controversial 1–7 to 1–6 win over Dublin. In the 22nd minute Dublin's Carla Rowe had a point disallowed. The umpires waved the effort wide but TV replays showed that Rowe's shot had actually gone between the posts. As Hawk-Eye was not used in the All-Ireland Senior Ladies' Football Championship, the decision stood. At half-time Dublin were leading by 0–4 to 0–3. As the second half started Rhona Ní Bhuachalla came on as a substitute and scored with an assist from Ciara O'Sullivan. The teams were level at 1–3 to 0–6 with twenty minutes remaining before Cork scored four unanswered points between the 48th and 54th minutes. Doireann O'Sullivan scored three while Orla Finn was also on target. Dublin were four points down in the final minute when Sinéad Aherne scored from a penalty.

Route to the Final

Match info

Teams

References

!
All-Ireland Senior Ladies' Football Championship Finals
Cork county ladies' football team matches
Dublin county ladies' football team matches
All-Ireland Senior Ladies' Football Championship Final
All-Ireland Senior Ladies' Football Championship Final, 2016